Pat Rabbitte (born 18 May 1949) is an Irish former Labour Party politician who served as Minister for Communications, Energy and Natural Resources from 2011 to 2014, Leader of the Labour Party from 2002 to 2007 and a Minister of State from 1994 to 1997. He served as a Teachta Dála (TD) for the Dublin South-West constituency from 1989 to 2016.

Early life
Patrick Rabbitte was born near Claremorris in 1949, and was brought up in Woodstock, Ballindine, County Mayo. He was educated locally at St Colman's College, Claremorris before emigrating to Britain to find employment. He returned shortly afterward to attend University College Galway (UCG) where he studied Arts and Law. Whilst at university, Rabbitte became involved in several college movements before serving as President of the UCG Students' Union in 1970–1971. He achieved national attention while serving, between 1972 and 1974, as President of the national Union of Students in Ireland (USI). Following the completion of his presidency in 1974, he became an official in the Irish Transport and General Workers' Union (ITGWU), becoming National Secretary for the union in 1980.

Rabbitte became involved in electoral politics for the first time in late 1982, when he unsuccessfully contested Dublin South-West for the Workers' Party (WP) at the November general election. He was elected to Dublin County Council in 1985. Having again failed in election at the 1987 general election, though with a greatly improved performance in the same constituency, he finally entered Dáil Éireann as a Teachta Dála (TD) for Dublin South-West at the 1989 election. He retained his seat at every subsequent election until his retirement in 2016—for the first two as a Democratic Left TD, and for subsequent ones representing the Labour Party.

After Tomás Mac Giolla's retirement as President of the WP in 1988, Rabbitte was seen as one of those who wanted to move the party away from its hard left position, and from its alignment with the Soviet Union and international communist and workers' parties. He and some others who had come from the USI via the trade union movement were seen as wanting to bring the WP toward the centre. This led Rabbitte, Eamon Gilmore and others to earn the nickname "The Student Princes". In 1992, Rabbitte played a prominent role with Proinsias De Rossa in an attempt to jettison some of the party's more hard-left positions. This eventually split the WP. Six of the seven TDs, including Rabbittee, joined Democratic Left.

Junior Minister: 1994–1997
In 1994, a new Rainbow Coalition government of Fine Gael, the Labour Party and Democratic Left came to office midway through the Dáil term. Rabbitte was appointed as Minister of State to the Government, as well as Minister at the Department of Enterprise and Employment with responsibility for Commerce, Science and Technology. He attended cabinet meetings, but without a vote. During his tenure as a junior minister, Rabbitte was involved in establishing an anti-drugs strategy as well as enacting legislation which gave the credit union movement more authority. Rabbitte also decided to locate the proposed new state-backed Technology Campus for West Dublin, based on high-speed telecommunication links, at CityWest Business Campus beside the N7 motorway, near Clondalkin.

Labour Party leader and aftermath
Following the 1997 general election the Rainbow Coalition lost office. In 1999, Democratic Left merged with the Labour Party, with Rabbitte participating in the negotiations. In October 2002 Rabbitte succeeded Ruairi Quinn as leader of the Labour Party. Under his leadership the party made some gains in the 2004 local elections. Rabbitte has been described as an extremely good performer in the Dáil, often outshining his Fine Gael counterpart Enda Kenny. He was also noted for his anti-Fianna Fáil rhetoric.

Under Rabbitte the Labour Party agreed to enter a pre-election pact with Fine Gael in an attempt to offer the electorate an alternative coalition government at the 2007 general election, which took place in May 2007. This was commonly known as The Mullingar Accord and the proposed alternative government was called the Alliance for Change. The Green Party were also anticipated to be likely members of the coalition government on the basis of agreed points of view on many issues covered by the Mullingar Accord.

The election result did not return a sufficient number of seats for the Alliance for Change to occupy government, even with the support of the Green Party. Rabbitte himself commented on the election result: "This leaves Mr. Ahern in the driving seat". Negotiations between Fianna Fáil and the Green Party resulted in a Fianna Fáil leader Bertie Ahern forming a new government on 13 June 2007.

Following the disappointing result in the election for Labour, Rabbitte announced he was stepping down as leader on 23 August 2007. In his resignation statement, he took responsibility for the outcome of the recent general election, in which his party failed to gain new seats and failed to replace the outgoing government. He was succeeded as party leader by Eamon Gilmore.

Rabbitte gained public attention on 18 November 2010 when he angrily criticised the Minister for Community, Equality and Gaeltacht Affairs, Pat Carey, when they appeared together on Prime Time. An online recording of the outburst was viewed 100,000 times in its first three days there.

Rabbitte was re-elected on the first count in the 2011 general election. His running mate Eamonn Maloney was also elected.

Ministerial career: 2011–2014
On 9 March 2011, Rabbitte was appointed Minister for Communications, Energy and Natural Resources.

The journalist Fintan O'Toole, writing in The Irish Times in August 2011, criticised the lack of royalties system for gas and oil in Ireland. He claimed: "The State is about to sign away almost all our resources on terms by far the worst in the developed world". Rabbitte responded with a letter, claiming that the article was inaccurate. Rabbitte's response was in turn criticised by Cian O'Callaghan, a Labour Party member of Fingal County Council, as "misguided".

In July 2014, Rabbitte was replaced by Alex White as part of a reshuffle of the cabinet. He did not contest the 2016 general election.

References

External links
Pat Rabbitte's page on the Labour Party website

1949 births
Living people
Alumni of the University of Galway
Councillors of Dublin County Council
Democratic Left (Ireland) TDs
Labour Party (Ireland) TDs
Leaders of the Labour Party (Ireland)
Local councillors in South Dublin (county)
Members of the 26th Dáil
Members of the 27th Dáil
Members of the 28th Dáil
Members of the 29th Dáil
Members of the 30th Dáil
Members of the 31st Dáil
Ministers of State of the 27th Dáil
Politicians from County Mayo
Workers' Party (Ireland) TDs
People from Claremorris